Anna Frijters (nee Velders) (1889–1966) was a Belgian screenwriter, producer, director and author, known for two silent films Leentje van de zee (1928) and De verloofde uit Canada (1934) which she wrote, produced and directed with her husband François Frijters in the late 1920s. She was also known as one of the early female screenwriters, who played an important role in pioneering the development of scriptwriting in the Belgium film industry.

Early life and career 
Before beginning their filmmaking careers, Anna and François Frijters were both diamond cutters in Antwerp and passionate about making their own films. Moving to the United States, they met with Ruth Roland, an American actress who starred in a number of silent films. Ruth Roland encouraged Anna Frijters to enter a screenplay competition arranged by Brewster Publications, where she won the second prize for her screenplay called Leentje van de zee (Peggy of the Sea). Her victory in this competition created largely critical receptions. Jule Selbo pointed out that Motion Picture Magazine, described her entry as puny, and showed its reaction as follows:

This success also paved the way for a wide range of offers coming from studios in the United States. She rejected all these offers because she wanted to follow her own path and pursue her filmmaking career with her husband François Frijters. At the same time, she did not want the American studios to influence her vision.

Leentje van de zee (Peggy of the Sea) 
With the help of their friends, the couple built a studio called Little Roland Studio in a suburb of Antwerp, where they planned to film Leentje van de zee (Peggy of the Sea) The film tells the story of a young girl who survived a shipwreck and was adopted by a fisherman. The fisherman was later accused of murdering a young boy who tried to seduce the girl.

Production 
Anna and François Frijters sold their house in order to make an investment for the film. The filming began in 1926 in St. Anneke, De Panne and inside the Liberty movie theatre. Victor Beng and Antoine Laureys assisted Frijters behind the camera. At Roland's request, Max Factor, who was the make-up artist in the film, came from Hollywood and joined the production. However, the couple went through some rough times completing the film. Due to budgetary problems and limited production facilities in the studio, the crew and cast consisted of amateurs who were only able complete the shooting outside of working hours. In addition, the filming was also postponed several times due to some other drawn-out problems such as the storm that damaged the building and the pregnancy of the lead actress Ive Bramé. The production, as a result,  lasted two years and had its premiere in the cinema of Antwerp zoo in 1928.

Distribution 
Anna Frijters decided to make the distribution on her own as she was rejected by the film distributors in Brussels. Her efforts of distributing the film yielded results to a certain extent, having her film released by only sub-run theaters in Belgium. She used patriotic slogans as a way of advertising her film and gaining the support of locals.

Reception 
The final result did not meet Frijters' expectations due to the arrival of sound film that overshadowed the film's public interest as well as the mainly negative reviews written about the film itself. In September 1929, Close Up magazine shared a small review that intended to disgrace the content of the film.

De verloofde uit Canada (The Fiancé from Canada) 
Frijters was discouraged from maintaining her interest in filmmaking after the critical and commercial backlash of Leentje van de Zee, though her husband, François Frijters, made a Newsreel film called Inhuldiging van het standbeeld van Guido Gezelle (Inauguration of the Statue of Guido Gezelle) in 1930. However, Frijters wrote a short comedy screenplay called De verloofde uit Canada (The Fiancé from Canada), which revolved around a working-class man who returned home from Canada and discovered that his fiancée Betty no longer loved him and was married to someone else. The main character was played by a comedian, Lowieke Staal.

Production 
Filming began throughout 1929 and 1930 in various locations of Belgium such as the World's Fair in Borsbeek and the warehouse at the Keyserlei, which is known as a prominent boulevard in Antwerp. However, the production process of the film was also problematic, due to the choice of amateur actors in the cast and their inflexible availabilities, which caused disagreements and replacements among the crew members. In addition, the post-production process lasted four years because of the lack of budget, causing the film to have its test screening in 1934.

As compared to the failure of her 1928 film, this film was given a green light to be scored by J. Antoon Zwijsen as a result of its successful test screening. However, the process was interrupted by a massive fire that destroyed the entire studio. Only the Zwijsen's musical score survived but the fire permanently marked the end of the Frijters' filmmaking career. Throughout history,  De verloofde uit Canada was remembered as a creative experiment with its combination of animated and conventional images.

Lost copies 
It was later discovered that the only son of the Frijters family, Roland, kept the copies of both films in his basement. These copies were later restored for their premiere at the Flanders International Film Festival in Gent in October 1986, with the participation of the cast of Leentje van de Zee.

Filmography

Writer

References

External links
 

Belgian screenwriters
Belgian women screenwriters
1889 births
1966 deaths
20th-century screenwriters